Paolo Lorenzi was the defending champion, but chose to compete at the 2013 ATP Vegeta Croatia Open Umag instead.

Alejandro González won the title, defeating Guido Andreozzi in the final, 6–4, 6–4.

Seeds

Draw

Finals

Top half

Bottom half

References
 Main Draw
 Qualifying Draw

Seguros Bolivar Open Medellin - Singles
2013 Singles